Givar (also Romanized as Gīvar; also known as Gabār, Gīār, and Kābār) is a village in Beyarjomand Rural District, Beyarjomand District, Shahrud County, Semnan Province, Iran. At the 2006 census, its population was 120, in 50 families.

References 

Populated places in Shahrud County